These hits topped the Dutch Top 40 in 1985.

See also
 1985 in music

References

1985 in the Netherlands
Netherlands
1985